In the past, leaders of the Church of Jesus Christ of Latter-day Saints (LDS Church) have consistently opposed marriages between members of different ethnicities, though interracial marriage is no longer considered a sin. In 1977, apostle Boyd K. Packer publicly stated that "[w]e've always counseled in the Church for our Mexican members to marry Mexicans, our Japanese members to marry Japanese, our Caucasians to marry Caucasians, our Polynesian members to marry Polynesians. ... The counsel has been wise." Nearly every decade for over a century—beginning with the church's formation in the 1830s until the 1970s—has seen some denunciations of miscegenation, with most of them focusing on black–white marriages. Church president Brigham Young even taught on multiple occasions that black–white marriage merited death for the couple and their children.

Until at least the 1960s, the church penalized white members who married black individuals by prohibiting both spouses from entering temples. Even after the temple and priesthood ban was lifted for black members in 1978 the church still officially discouraged any marriage across ethnic lines. Until 2013 at least one official church manual in use had continued discouraging interracial marriages. Past teachings of church leaders on race and interracial marriage have stemmed from biological and social ideas of the time and have garnered criticism and controversy.

Early church leaders made an exception to the interracial marriage teachings by allowing white LDS men to marry Native American women, because Native Americans were viewed as being descended from the Israelites; however, it did not sanction white LDS women marrying Native American men. In 2013, the LDS Church disavowed previous teachings which stated that interracial marriage is a sin.

Utah's legislation on interracial relationships

The church's attitude was reflected by past laws in Utah, where its members held a notable amount of political influence. In 1852, the Act in Relation to Service which allowed the enslavement of black people in Utah Territory was passed, and it also banned sexual intercourse between a white person and "any of the African race." That same day the Act for the relief of Indian Slaves and Prisoners which allowed white Utah residents to enslave Native Americans was passed, however, it did not contain any provisions on sexual intercourse. In 1888, the government of Utah Territory, whose population was about 80% Mormon in 1880, passed an anti-miscegenation law. The law prohibited marriages between a "negro" and a "mongolian" (i.e. Asian person) and a "white person". In 1890, black individuals made up less than 0.3% of Utah's population of 210,000 people, Chinese individuals made up less than 0.4%, and Native Americans made up 1.6%. In 1939, the two-thirds-Mormon majority in the Utah State Legislature expanded the law so it would prohibit a white person from marrying a "Mongolian, a member of the malay race or a mulatto, quadroon, or octoroon." However, unlike laws which existed in other states, Utah's law did not prohibit marriages between white people and Native American people. The laws which banned interracial marriages remained in place until they were repealed by the Utah State Legislature in 1963.

Interracial marriages with Native Americans

Mormons considered Native Americans to be a higher race than black people, based on their belief that Native Americans were descendants of the Israelites, and they also believed that through intermarriage, the skin color of Native Americans could be restored to a "white and delightsome" state. On July 17, 1831, church founder Joseph Smith said he received a revelation in which God wanted several early elders of the church to eventually marry Native American women in a polygamous relationship so their posterity may become "white, delightsome, and just."

Though he believed that Native American peoples were "degraded", and "fallen in every respect, in habits, custom, flesh, spirit, blood, desire", Smith's successor Brigham Young also allowed Mormon men to marry Native American women as part of a process that would make their people white and delightsome and restore them to their "pristine beauty" within a few generations, However, a Native American man was prohibited from marrying a white woman in Mormon communities. Young performed the first recorded sealing ceremony between a "Lamanite" and a white member in October 1845 when an Oneida man Lewis Dana and Mary Gont were sealed in the Nauvoo Temple. There is evidence that Young may have married his Bannock servant Sally (who later married Ute chief Kanosh). By 1870 only about 30 Mormon men had Native American wives, and few further interracial marriages with Native Americans occurred. Later Mormons believed that Native American skins would be lightened through some other method. Under the presidency of Spencer W. Kimball, the church began discouraging interracial marriages with Native Americans.

In canonized scripture

The Book of Mormon

In the Book of Mormon, the Lord cursed the Lamanites (Jacob 3:5), and as a sign of the curse their skin was marked with blackness. The black marking was made so that the Nephites would not find the Lamanites "enticing" (2 Nephi 5:21), "that they might not mix and believe in incorrect traditions" (Alma 3:8), and so that the Nephites and the Lamanites would remain a separate people (Alma 3:14). If a Nephite intermarried and had children with a Lamanite, the Lord also cursed and marked them (Alma 3:15) and cursed their descendants (2 Nephi 5:23 and Alma 3:9).

Hugh Nibley, a prominent Mormon apologist, argues that the curse could be thought of as a culture with traditions that were inconsistent with God's commandments. He argues the curse did not spread through intermarriage alone, but that the Nephites had to participate in the Lamanite culture. He argues that Lord put the mark on the Lamanites to prevent the spread of Lamanite culture among the Nephites. The Book of Mormon Seminary Teacher Manual, which is currently used to teach seminary students about the Book of Mormon, quotes apostle Joseph Fielding Smith as stating that the skin color was changed to "keep the two peoples from mixing".

The Pearl of Great Price
In the Book of Abraham in the Pearl of Great Price, the name of Ham's wife is Egyptus, which is given the meaning of forbidden. It teaches that their grandson, Pharaoh, was a descendant of the Canaanites (Abraham 1:22), a race of people who had been cursed with black skin for committing genocide against "the people of Shum". (Moses 7:8). W. W. Phelps, an early church leader, taught that Ham himself was cursed because he had married a black wife. In The Way to Perfection, apostle Joseph Fielding Smith quoted B. H. Roberts in pointing out that Egyptus means forbidden, and suggests that might be because she was "of a race with which those who held the priesthood were forbidden to intermarry." The Old Testament Student Manual, which is the manual currently used to study the Old Testament in church Institutes of Religion, teaches that Ham's sons were denied the priesthood because he had married Egyptus.

The Bible
In Genesis 28:1, Isaac commands Jacob not to marry the Canaanites.  The Old Testament Seminary Teacher Manual, which is the manual currently used to teach the Old Testament to seminary students, teaches that it is because "a daughter of Canaan would not be worthy to join Jacob in entering into a marriage covenant with the Lord."

In Deuteronomy 7, the Israelites were commanded not to marry the Canaanites. In 1954, apostle Mark E. Petersen used this as an example of why the church did not allow interracial marriages.

In Judges 14, Samson marries a Philistine woman. The Old Testament Seminary Teacher Manual teaches that marrying a Philistine was against the will of God.

19th-century teachings on black–white marriages

Joseph Smith

In January 1843 church founder Joseph Smith wrote, "Had I [anything] to do with the Negro I would confine them by strict [l]aw to their own species," in reference to interracial marriage. A year later as mayor of Nauvoo, Illinois, he held a trial and fined two black men the modern equivalent of thousands of dollars for trying to marry white women. However, a decade earlier hundreds of non-Mormon citizens of Jackson County, Missouri, stated that the Mormons were inviting black people to live among them, thus, creating the risk of interracial marriage, citing this as one of the reasons for requesting the removal of the Mormon people from the state. The apostle Parley P. Pratt denied this invitation had taken place, however.

There are other records of Smith's teaching on interracial marriage. For example, in 1897 First Presidency member George Q. Cannon stated in his journal that Joseph Smith had taught a later president of the church, John Taylor, that a white man married to a woman with black ancestry could not receive the priesthood and they both would be killed along with any of their children if the penalty of the law were executed. Three years later Cannon also stated that Smith had taught Taylor the doctrine that any male child born with any black heritage from one or more parents could not receive the priesthood as he was "tainted with Negro blood." In 1908, church president Joseph F. Smith stated that the church founder had declared that the priesthood ordination was void for Elijah Abel who only had one black great-grandparent (Abel was referred to as an octoroon man at the time for his one-eighth black heritage) from a mixed-race marriage long ago. Abel's petitions for temple ordinances were also denied by the next two church presidents Brigham Young and John Taylor because of his mixed heritage.

Brigham Young

On at least three occasions (1847, 1852, and 1865) Smith's successor Brigham Young publicly taught that the punishment for black–white interracial marriages was death, and the killing of a black–white interracial couple and their children as part of a blood atonement would be a blessing to them. He further stated that interracial children are sterile "like a mule", a teaching later repeated in a church magazine. Young taught that the moment the church consents to white members having children with black individuals the church would go to destruction, and that, "Any man having one drop of the seed of Cane in him cannot hold the priesthood." Young also taught that people who had children with a black person would be cursed to the priesthood.

Similar to honor killings as well as a form of human sacrifice, blood atonement is the belief that Jesus' atonement for humanity's sins does not apply to some sins, such as miscegenation, because they are so heinous. To atone for these sins, their perpetrators should be killed in a way that allows their blood to be shed upon the ground as a sacrificial offering. This doctrine was most widely taught during the Mormon Reformation. Examples of how Young applied his teaching of it with regard to interracial relationships are as follows:

 1847 — Young heard of a Mormon family composed of a black man Enoch Lovejoy Lewis (son of ordained priesthood holder Kwaku Walker Lewis), a white woman Mary Matilda Webster, and their interracial child living in Massachusetts and responded that if the family wasn't living so close to non-Mormons "they would all have to be killed" since the law is that black and white seed should not be "amalgamated".
 1852 — As territory governor, Young stated before the territory legislature that if a white man had children with a black woman, he should request to have his head chopped off. He continued saying that if someone were to kill the man, woman and any children of such a union, that it would be a blessing to them and "it would do a great deal towards atoning for the sin".
 1865 — In a speech in the Salt Lake Tabernacle Young repeated the teaching of death as punishment for black and white individuals producing interracial offspring, stating that this penalty would always be in place.

Interracial marriages of William McCary
In 1847, former slave and Mormon convert William McCary drew the ire of Brigham Young and others in Nauvoo for his marriage to the white Mormon Lucy Stanton, and his later alleged mixed-race polygamous sealings to other white women without authorization. McCary claimed Native American heritage in order to marry Stanton and avoid the greater stigma that the few black people in Nauvoo faced. The most common interpretation of the interracial events around McCary and his excommunication is that they contributed to or precipitated the subsequent ban of black members from temple ordinances and priesthood authority. McCary elicited the first recorded general authority statement connecting race and the priesthood when the apostle Parley Pratt referred to him as the "black man who has got the blood of Ham in him which linege [sic] was cursed as regards the priesthood."

Lynching of Thomas Coleman
In 1866, Thomas Coleman, a black member of the LDS Church, was murdered in Salt Lake City after it was discovered that he was courting a white woman. His throat was slit so deeply from ear to ear that he was nearly decapitated, and his right breast was slit open, similar to the penalties illustrated in the temple endowment and taught by Brigham Young. He was castrated and a note warning black men to stay away from white women was pinned to his chest. Historian D. Michael Quinn states that this murder was a fulfillment of Young's 1852 teaching that the penalty for miscegenation was decapitation. FairMormon argues that Coleman's death may have been unrelated to Young's teachings or temple penalties, since Coleman was not an endowed member.

Under Wilford Woodruff
In the late 1800s at least two white members were denied church ordinances after they had married a black person. In 1895, a white woman was denied a temple sealing to her white husband because she had previously married a black man, even though she had divorced him. First Presidency member George Q. Cannon argued that allowing her access to the temple would not be fair to her two daughters, whom she'd had with her former husband. Another white man was denied the priesthood in 1897 because he had married a black woman, though, then senior apostle Lorenzo Snow stated that the man would be eligible if he divorced his wife and married a white woman. Additionally, Cannon recorded in his journal having stated in 1881 that when it came to the important question of interracial marriage, Mormons believed against "intermarriage with inferior races, particularly the negro."

1900–1950 teachings

George Q. Cannon
In 1900, George Q. Cannon, first counselor in the First Presidency under Lorenzo Snow, repeated Brigham Young's teachings that if a man who had the priesthood married a black woman, then according to the law of the Lord, the man and any offspring should be killed so that the seed of Cain did not receive the priesthood.

Rudger Clawson

In 1903 the apostle Rudger Clawson recorded that the Quorum of the Twelve and the First Presidency decided that a young male member who had requested to marry his fiance in the temple was "tainted with negro blood" through one black great-grandparent and, thus, could not marry in the temple. A few days after the decision he stated in a stake conference that the white members should be glad to be "wellborn" so they can have the blessings of the temple and referenced the young man who was denied a temple marriage as he was one-eighth black or "tainted with the blood of Cain". Clawson later lamented in a meeting that the man's white father of "pure parentage" had brought a curse upon his posterity by marrying a woman with one black grandparent.

B. H. Roberts
Some other early-20th-century teachings on the subject include the highly influential 1907 Deseret News five-volume book series The Seventy's Course in Theology by church seventy and prominent Mormon theologian B. H. Roberts. In it Roberts dedicates an entire lesson of the first volume to the "Negro Race Problem", and approvingly quoted a Southern author who stated that a social divide between white and black people should be maintained at all costs as socializing would lead to mixed-race marriages with an inferior race and no disaster would compare to this as it would doom the Caucasian race. It cited multiple biological justifications such as craniology (phrenology) to defend banning black–white "commingling". Additionally, a 1913 church publication in the church's Young Woman's Journal encouraged young women to maintain white racial purity and health by avoiding "race disintegration" and "race suicide".

J. Reuben Clark

First Presidency member J. Reuben Clark told Young Women general leaders in 1946 that, "It is sought today in certain quarters to break down all race prejudice, and at the end of the road ... is intermarriage. ...[D]o not ever let that wicked virus get into your systems that brotherhood either permits or entitles you to mix races which are inconsistent. Biologically, it is wrong; spiritually, it is wrong." The quote was reprinted in the church's official Improvement Era magazine. Three years later as senior vice-president of the church-owned Hotel Utah which then banned black people, Clark stated that the ban was in place to prevent interracial socializing that could hurt church leaders' efforts "to preserve the purity of the race that is entitled to hold the priesthood" and that the church taught white members to avoid social interaction with black people.

Under George Albert Smith
In 1947, the First Presidency, headed by George Albert Smith, sent a response letter to a California stake president inquiring on the subject stating, "Social intercourse between the Whites and the Negroes should certainly not be encouraged because of leading to intermarriage, which the Lord has forbidden. ... [T]rying to break down social barriers between the Whites and the Blacks is [a move] that should not be encouraged because inevitably it means the mixing of the races if carried to its logical conclusion." Two months later in a letter to another member Utah State sociology professor Lowry Nelson, the First Presidency stated that marriage between a white person and a black person is "most repugnant" and "does not have the sanction of the Church and is contrary to church doctrine".

1950–1978 teachings

Under David O. McKay
The latter half of the 20th century saw many changes in American legal and social views of interracial marriage, and many changes in top church leaders' teachings on the topic. For instance, church apostle Mark E. Petersen said in a 1954 address that church doctrine barred black people and white people from marrying each other. The speech was circulated among BYU religion faculty, much to the embarrassment of fellow LDS scholars, and over twenty years later Petersen denied knowing if the copies of his speech being passed around were authentic or not, apparently out of embarrassment.

In 1958, church apostle Bruce R. McConkie published Mormon Doctrine, in which he stated that "the whole negro race have been cursed with a black skin, the mark of Cain, so they can be identified as a caste apart, a people with whom the other descendants of Adam should not intermarry." The quote remained, despite many other revisions, until the church's Deseret Book ceased printing the book in 2010. The apostle Delbert L. Stapley wrote in a 1964 letter to George W. Romney that black people should not be entitled to "inter-marriage privileges with the Whites."

In 1960 at the church-run flagship school Brigham Young University leaders were "very much concerned" when a male black student received a large number of votes for student vice president, and, subsequently, apostle Harold Lee told BYU's president Ernest Wilkinson he would hold him responsible if one of his granddaughters ever went to "BYU and bec[a]me engaged to a colored boy". A few months later in February 1961 the BYU Board of Trustees decided to officially encourage black students to attend other universities for the first time. By 1965 administrators were sending a rejection letter to black applicants which cited BYU's discouragement of interracial courtship and marriage as the motive behind the decision, and by 1968 there was only one black American student on campus.

In 1966, a white woman who had received her endowment was banned by local leaders from returning to the temple and was told her endowment was invalid because she had since married a black man. Church president David O. McKay upheld the ban on her going to the temple, but ruled that her endowment was still valid.

Spencer W. Kimball

Apostle Spencer W. Kimball gave several speeches addressing the subject. In a June 1958 address at Brigham Young University, he stated that "[w]hen I said you must teach your people to overcome their prejudices and accept the Indians, I did not mean that you would encourage intermarriage ... we must discourage intermarriage ... it is not expedient." He clarified, however, that interracial marriage was not considered a sin. In a January 1959 address Kimball taught that church leaders were unanimous in teachings that Caucasians should marry Caucasians, stating that interracial marriage was selfish because the background differences could pose challenges to the marriage and children. He also told BYU students in 1965 that "the brethren feel that it is not the wisest thing to cross racial lines in dating and marrying", something he repeated to them as church president over a decade later in 1976.

Teachings from 1978–present

Church publications have also contained statements discouraging interracial marriage. In the same June 1978 issue announcing that black members were now eligible for temple ordinances, missionary service, and priesthood ordination, the official newspaper of the LDS Church also printed an article entitled "Interracial marriage discouraged". The same day, a church spokesman stated "interracial marriages generally have been discouraged in the past, ... that remains our position" and that "the Church does not prohibit ... interracial marriages but it does discourage them."

In 2003, author Jon Krakauer stated in his Under the Banner of Heaven that "official LDS policy has continued to strongly admonish white saints not to marry blacks". In response, the church's public affairs released a statement from BYU Dean of Religious Education Robert L. Millet that "[t]here is, in fact, no mention whatsoever in [the church] handbook concerning interracial marriages. In addition, having served as a Church leader for almost 30 years, I can also certify that I have never received official verbal instructions condemning marriages between black and white members." Though, denying any condemnation of interracial marriage, there was no comment on whether it was still discouraged. The most recent statement came in 2008 when spokesperson Mark Tuttle stated that the church has no policy against interracial marriage.

The discouragement of marriage between those of different ethnicities by church leaders continued being taught to youth during Sunday meetings until 2013, when the use of the 1996 version of the church Sunday meeting manual for adolescent boys was discontinued. The manual had used a 1976 quote from past church president Kimball that said, "We recommend that people marry those who are of the same racial background generally". The quote is still in use, however, in the 2003 institute Eternal Marriage Student Manual. Additionally, a footnote to a 1995 general conference talk by the apostle Russell M. Nelson notes that loving without racial discrimination is a general commandment, but not one to apply to specific marriage partner criteria since it states that being united in ethnic background increases the probability of a successful marriage. In 2013, the LDS Church published an essay entitled "Race and the Priesthood" on its official website. The essay disavowed teachings in the past that interracial marriage was a sin, indicating that it was influenced by the racism of the era.

Notable LDS members in interracial marriages

 Gerrit W. Gong — an apostle. Gong is Asian-American and is married to Susan Lindsay, who is white.
 Larry Echo Hawk — a general authority who was a registered member of the Pawnee Tribe; his wife is white.
 Peter M. Johnson — the first African-American called as a general authority; his wife is white.
 Mia Love — former U.S. Representative for Utah. Love is Haitian-American and her husband, Jason, is white.
 Eduardo Balderas — first full-time translator for the LDS Church. Balderas was born in Mexico and his wife was an Anglo-American. 
 Alvin B. Jackson — former State Senator in Utah. Jackson is African-American and his wife, Juleen, is white.
 Yoeli Childs professional basketball player. Childs is half white-half black and his wife Megan is white. 
 Alex Boyé — singer and entertainer. Boyé is a British-born child of Nigerian parents, and his wife Julie is white.

See also

 Anti-miscegenation laws
 Black people and Mormonism
 Celestial marriage
 Culture of the Church of Jesus Christ of Latter-day Saints
 Miscegenation
 Marriage in the Church of Jesus Christ of Latter-day Saints
 Phrenology and the Latter Day Saint movement

References

The Church of Jesus Christ of Latter-day Saints
Mormonism and race
Sexuality and Mormonism
Marriage in Mormonism
Latter-day Saints